= May Badger =

Chemist

- Born: 18 February 1887
- Died: 24 November 1953 (aged 66)
- Education: Faculty of Technology of Victoria University
- Scientific career
- Fields: Inorganic Chemistry
- Doctoral advisor: William Pope

May Badger was one of the first women to work at the University of Manchester, her career developing until she became Head of the Inorganic Chemistry Laboratories by 1952.

== Education ==
Badger attended Ardwick Higher Grade School, following on from which she received a BSc Tech (Applied Chem. Hons. Div) at the Faculty of Technology of Victoria University in 1907.

In 1908 she gained a MSc Tech, which she completed with William Pope after receiving a postgraduate scholarship.

== Career ==
Badger became a research chemist after her time in education, working on glass and pottery at Pilkington Tile and Pottery Co. Then, in 1911, she became a chemist at Clifton and Kersley Coal Co.

In 1916 Badger returned to the University of Manchester to become a Senior Demonstrator in Chemistry for the Faculty of Technology. She stayed there for the rest of her career until her retirement in 1952, finishing as Head of the Inorganic Chemistry Laboratories.
